The Federation of Children's Book Groups Children's Book Award is a set of annual literary prizes for children's books published in the U.K. during the preceding calendar year. It recognises one "Overall" winner and one book in each of three categories: Books for Younger Children, Books for Younger Readers, and Books for Older Readers. The selections are made entirely by children, which is unique among British literary awards. It was previously known as the Red House Children's Book Award.

The Federation of Children's Book Groups owns and coordinates the Award, which it inaugurated in 1981 as the Children's Book Award. Its purpose has been "to celebrate the books that children themselves love reading." From 2001 to 2015 it was sponsored by the mail order bookshop Red House —a brand owned by bookselling company The Book People.

Process and latest rendition

The 2017 Overall Winner was from the Books for Younger Readers category and was won by Michael Morpurgo and illustrator Michael Foreman for An Eagle in the Snow, published by Harper Collins. The 2017 winners were announced at an Award Ceremony held in London on Saturday 10 June 2017.

The 2016 Overall Winner was from the Books for Younger Readers category and was won by Pamela Butchart and illustrator Thomas Flintham with My Head Teacher is a Vampire Rat, published by Nosy Crow.

The 2015 Overall Winner was from the Books for Younger Children and was announced at the Imagine Festival in February. The Winners were Oliver Jeffeys and Drew Daywalt with 'The Days the Crayons Quit', published by Harper Collins.

The 2014 Overall winner was from the Older Readers category, announced in mid-February 2014: The 5th Wave, written by Rick Yancey and published by Penguin Books.

Winners are determined by the votes of children on three category ballots composed by nominations from the same group. "Children from around the world" are eligible to participate in both stages. At least in Britain, many children participate through book groups.

The three ballots, or shortlists, comprise those ten books that garner the most nominations. There are four books on the Younger Children ballot and three each on the Younger Readers and Older Readers ballots.

Winners

Currently the annual awards cover books first published in the U.K. during the calendar year.

From 1992 to 2017 —the period of one Overall and three category awards— 13 Overall winners have come from the Long Novel or Older Readers category, 76 from the Short Novel or Younger Readers category, 4 from the Picture Book or Younger Children category.

2017
Overall: An Eagle in the Snow written by Michael Morpurgo, illustrated by Michael Foreman (HarperCollins)
Younger Children: Oi Dog! by Kes and Claire Gray and illustrated by Jim Field (Hachette)
Younger Readers: An Eagle in the Snow written by Michael Morpurgo, illustrated by Michael Foreman (HarperCollins)
Older Readers: One by Sarah Crossan (Bloomsbury)

2016

 Overall: My Head Teacher is a Vampire Rat by Pamela Butchart, illus. Thomas Flintham (Nosy Crow)
 Younger Children: Is There a Dog in this Book? by Viviane Schwarz (Walker)
 Younger Readers: My Head Teacher is a Vampire Rat by Pamela Butchart, illus. Thomas Flintham (Nosy Crow)
 Older Readers: Apple and Rain by Sarah Crossan (Bloomsbury)

2015

 Overall: The Day the Crayons Quit by Drew Daywalt, illus. Oliver Jeffers (HarperCollins) 
 Younger Children: The Day the Crayons Quit  by Drew Daywalt, illus. Oliver Jeffers (HarperCollins)
 Younger Readers: Demon Dentist by David Walliams (HarperCollins) 
 Older Readers: Split Second by Sophie McKenzie (Simon and Schuster)

2014

 Overall: The 5th Wave by Rick Yancey (Penguin)
 Younger Children: Superworm by Julia Donaldson, illus. Axel Scheffler (Scholastic)
 Younger Readers: Atticus Claw Breaks the Law by Jennifer Gray (Faber)
 Older Readers: The 5th Wave by Rick Yancey (Penguin)

2013

 Overall: The Spooky Spooky House by Andrew Weale, illus. Lee Wildish (Corgi)
 Younger Children: The Spooky Spooky House by Andrew Weale, illus.  Lee Wildish (Corgi)
 Younger Readers: Gangsta Granny by David Walliams, illus. Tony Ross (HarperCollins)
 Older Readers: The Medusa Project: Hit Squad by Sophie McKenzie (Simon & Schuster)

2012

 Overall: A Monster Calls by Patrick Ness and Jim Kay (Walker Books)
 Younger Children: Scruffy Bear and the Six White Mice by Chris Wormell (Jonathan Cape)
 Younger Readers: The Brilliant World of Tom Gates by Liz Pichon (Scholastic)
 Older Readers: A Monster Calls by Patrick Ness and Jim Kay (Walker Books)

2011

 Overall: Shadow by Michael Morpurgo (HarperCollins)
 Younger Children: Yuck! That's not a Monster! by Angela McAllister, illus. Alison Edgson (Little Tiger Press)
 Younger Readers: Shadow by Michael Morpurgo (HarperCollins)
 Older Readers: Time Riders by Alex Scarrow (Penguin)

2010

 Overall: Hunger Games by Suzanne Collins (Scholastic)
 Younger Children: Bottoms Up! by Jeanne Willis, illus. Adam Stower (Puffin Books)
 Younger Readers: Mondays are Murder by Tanya Landman (Walker)
 Older Readers: Hunger Games by Suzanne Collins (Scholastic)

2009

 Overall: Blood Ties by Sophie McKenzie (Simon & Schuster)
 Younger Children: The Pencil by Allan Ahlberg, illus. Bruce Ingman (Walker Books)
 Younger Readers: Daisy and the Trouble with Zoos by Kes Gray, illus. Nick Sharratt and Garry Parsons (Transworld)
 Older Readers: Blood Ties by Sophie McKenzie (Simon & Schuster)

2008

 Overall: Skulduggery Pleasant by Derek Landy (HarperCollins)
 Younger Children: Penguin by Polly Dunbar (Walker)
 Younger Readers: Ottoline and the Yellow Cat by Chris Riddell (Macmillan)
 Older Readers: Skulduggery Pleasant by Derek Landy (HarperCollins)

2007

 Overall: You're a Bad Man, Mr Gum! by Andy Stanton (Egmont)
 Younger Children: Who's in the Loo? by Jeanne Willis, illus. Adrian Reynolds (Andersen Press)
 Younger Readers: You're a Bad Man, Mr Gum! by Andy Stanton (Egmont)
 Older Readers: Girl, Missing by Sophie McKenzie (Simon & Schuster)

2006

 Overall: The Lightning Thief by Rick Riordan (Disney Hyperion)
 Younger Children: Pigs Might Fly! by Jonathan Emmett and Steve Cox (Puffin)
 Younger Readers: Spy Dog by Andrew Cope (Puffin)
 Older Readers: The Lightning Thief by Rick Riordan (Disney Hyperion)

2005

 Overall: Baby Brains by Simon James (Walker)
 Younger Children: Baby Brains by Simon James (Walker)
 Younger Readers: Best Friends by Jacqueline Wilson (Doubleday)
 Older Readers: CHERUB: The Recruit by Robert Muchamore (Hodder)

2004

 Overall: Private Peaceful by Michael Morpurgo (HarperCollins)
 Younger Children: Billy's Bucket by Kes Gray, illus. Garry Parsons (The Bodley Head)
 Younger Readers: The Mum Hunt by Gwyneth Rees (Macmillan)
 Older Readers: Private Peaceful by Michael Morpurgo (HarperCollins)

2003

 Overall: Skeleton Key by Anthony Horowitz (Walker)
 Younger Children: Pants by Giles Andreae, illus. Nick Sharratt (David Fickling)
 Younger Readers: Blitzed by Robert Swindells (Doubleday)
 Older Readers: Skeleton Key by Anthony Horowitz (Walker)

2002

 Overall: Noughts and Crosses by Malorie Blackman (Corgi)
 Younger Children: The Man Who Wore All His Clothes by Allan Ahlberg, illus. Katharine McEwen (Walker)
 Younger Readers: Out of the Ashes by Michael Morpurgo (Macmillan)
 Older Readers: Noughts and Crosses by Malorie Blackman (Corgi)

2001

 Overall: East Your Peas by Kes Gray, illustrated by Nick Sharratt (The Bodley Head)
 Picture Book: Eat Your Peas by Kes Gray, illus. Nick Sharratt (The Bodley Head)
 Short Novel: Lizzie Zipmouth by Jacqueline Wilson, illus. Nick Sharratt (Corgi)
 Long Novel: Harry Potter and the Goblet of Fire by J. K. Rowling (Bloomsbury)

2000

 Overall: Kensuke's Kingdom by Michael Morpurgo, illus. Michael Foreman (Heinemann)
 Picture Book: Demon Teddy by Nicholas Allan (Hutchinson)
 Short Novel: Kensuke's Kingdom by Michael Morpurgo, illus. Michael Foreman (Heinemann)
 Long Novel: Harry Potter and the Prisoner of Azkaban by J. K. Rowling (Bloomsbury)

1999

 Overall: Harry Potter and the Chamber of Secrets by J. K. Rowling (Bloomsbury)
 Picture Book: What! by Kate Lum, illus. Adrian Johnson (Bloomsbury)
 Short Novel: Little Dad by Pat Moon, illus. Nick Sharratt (Mammoth)
 Long Novel: Harry Potter and the Chamber of Secrets by J. K. Rowling (Bloomsbury)

1998

 Overall: Harry Potter and the Philosopher's Stone by J. K. Rowling (Bloomsbury)
 Picture Book: The Lion Who Wanted to Love by Giles Andreae (Orchard Books)
 Short Novel: Nightmare Stairs by Robert Swindells (Doubleday)
 Long Novel: Harry Potter and the Philosopher's Stone by J. K. Rowling (Bloomsbury)

1997

 Overall: The Hundred-Mile-an-Hour Dog by Jeremy Strong (Viking)
 Picture Book: Mr Bear to the Rescue by Debi Gliori (The O'Brien Press)
 Short Novel: The Hundred-Mile-an-Hour Dog by Jeremy Strong (Viking)
 Long Novel: Which Way is Home? by Ian Strachan (Methuen)

1996

 Overall: Double Act by Jacqueline Wilson (Doubleday)
 Picture Book: Solo by Paul Geraghty (Hutchinson)
 Short Novel: Double Act by Jacqueline Wilson (Doubleday)
 Long Novel: The Wreck of the Zanzibar by Michael Morpurgo (Heinemann)

1995

 Overall: Harriet's Hare by Dick King-Smith (Doubleday)
 Picture Book: The Rascally Cake by Jeanne Willis, illus. Korky Paul (Andersen Press)
 Short Novel: Harriet's Hare by Dick King-Smith (Doubleday)
 Long Novel: Walk Two Moons by Sharon Creech (Pan Macmillan)

1994

 Overall: The Boy in the Bubble by Ian Strachan (Methuen)
 Picture Book: Amazing Anthony Ant by Lorna and Graham Philpot (Orion)
 Short Novel: The Finders by Nigel Hinton (Viking)
 Long Novel: The Boy in the Bubble by Ian Strachan (Methuen)

1993

 Overall: The Suitcase Kid by Jacqueline Wilson (Heinemann)
 Picture Book: Snowy by Berlie Doherty (Collins)
 Short Novel: The Suitcase Kid by Jacqueline Wilson (Heinemann)
 Long Novel: Gulf by Robert Westall (Methuen)

1992

 Overall: Kiss the Dust by Elizabeth Laird (Methuen)
 Picture Book: SHHH! by Sally Grindley and Peter Utton (ABC)
 Short Novel: Find the White Horse by Dick King-Smith (Viking)
 Long Novel: Kiss the Dust by Elizabeth Laird (Methuen)

1991

Threadbear by Mick Inkpen (Hodder & Stoughton)

1990

Room 13 by Robert Swindells (Doubleday)

1989

Matilda by Roald Dahl, illus. Quentin Blake (Jonathan Cape)

1988

Winnie the Witch by Valerie Thomas, illus.  Korky Paul (Oxford University Press)

1987

The Jolly Postman by Janet and Allan Ahlberg (Heinemann)

1986

Arthur by Amanda Graham (Spindlewood)

1985

Brother in the Land by Robert Swindells (Oxford University Press)

1984

The Saga of Erik the Viking by Terry Jones, illus. Michael Foreman (Pavilion)

1983

The BFG by Roald Dahl, illus. Quentin Blake (Jonathan Cape)

1982

Fair's Fair by Leon Garfield (Macdonald Young Books)

1981

Mister Magnolia by Quentin Blake (Jonathan Cape)

Winners of multiple awards

Prior to winning the 2012 Red House Award, Overall, A Monster Calls was named the 2011 British Children's Book of the Year. Subsequently, Ness and Kay as writer and illustrator won both annual children's book awards from the professional librarians, the  Carnegie Medal and Greenaway Medal; that double award alone was an unprecedented sweep. In fact, no previous Children's/Red House Award winner (Overall) has won the Carnegie Medal and only one has won the Greenaway Medal for illustration: the inaugural Children's winner Mr Magnolia (Jonathan Cape, 1980), written and illustrated by Quentin Blake.

Authors with multiple Children's/Red House awards
Michael Morpurgo has won four Overall awards for Kensuke's Kingdom in 2000, Private Peaceful in 2004, Shadow in 2011 and An Eagle in the Snow in 2017. He has also won category awards for The Wreck of the Zanzibar in 1996 and Out of Ashes in 2002.

Four other authors have won two Overall awards:
 Roald Dahl 1983, 1989
 Robert Swindells 1985, 1990
 Jacqueline Wilson 1993, 1996
 J. K. Rowling 1998, 1999

J. K. Rowling won the Long Novel category four years in succession, 1998 to 2001, for the first four Harry Potter books.

See also

Notes

References

Citations
 Red House Children's Book Award (RHCBA). Retrieved 2012-09-23. Select from the left menu.

External links
 Red House Children's Book Award at Booktrust 

British children's literary awards
Picture book awards
1981 establishments in the United Kingdom
Awards established in 1981